William Mordaunt Furneaux was a career schoolmaster who became Headmaster of Repton School and a Canon of Southwell before his appointment as Dean of Winchester in the early decades of the 20th century.

Educated at Marlborough College and Corpus Christi College, Oxford, he was ordained as a priest and after leaving Oxford entered the teaching profession.

His funeral was held at Winchester Cathedral on Friday April 13, 1928.

Publications
A Companion to the Public School Hymn Book (1904)
Introduction to the Lessons of the Lectionary (Winchester: new edition, 1924)
The Acts of the Apostles: A Commentary for English Readers (Oxford: Clarendon Press, 1912)

Notes

1848 births
People educated at Marlborough College
Alumni of Corpus Christi College, Oxford
Schoolteachers from Wiltshire
Deans of Winchester
Headmasters of Repton School
1928 deaths